St. Ambrose Church was a Catholic parish church in Bridgeport, Connecticut, part of the  Diocese of Bridgeport. The church was sometimes referred to as the Church on the Hill. St. Ambrose's Church was a landmark in this part of Bridgeport, Connecticut, built in a Romanesque style in 1939 to the designs of Brooklyn architect Anthony J. DePace of DePace & Juster. The parish was closed in 2012. In 2022, the property was announced as the new site of Fairfield Bellarmine, a new campus of Fairfield University.

References

External links 
 St. Ambrose Parish Website
 St. Ambrose - Diocesan information 
 Diocese of Bridgeport

Anthony J. DePace church buildings
Romanesque Revival church buildings in Connecticut
Roman Catholic churches completed in 1939
Saint Ambrose Parish
Roman Catholic Diocese of Bridgeport
20th-century Roman Catholic church buildings in the United States

Former Catholic church buildings
Former Roman Catholic church buildings in Connecticut